The 2015 Novilon EDR Cup  was a bicycle race in the Netherlands, which formed part of the Dutch one day women's elite race season. It was rated by the UCI as a 1.2 category race. The race was won in a sprint finish by Kirsten Wild, ahead of Chloe Hosking and Christine Majerus.

Results

See also
2015 in women's road cycling

References

External links
  

Ronde van Drenthe (women's race)
Novilon EDR Cup
Novilon EDR Cup
Novilon EDR Cup